This is a list of major and official Austronesian languages, a language family originating from Taiwan, that is widely dispersed throughout the islands of Southeast Asia and the Pacific, with a few members spoken on continental Asia and Madagascar.

Official languages

Sovereign states

Territories

Major languages

Languages with at least 3 million native speakers 
 Javanese (100 million)
 Tagalog (Filipino) (47 million native, ~100 million total)
 Indonesian (42 million native, ~270 million total)
 Sundanese (42 million)
 Malay (30 million)
 Cebuano (22 million native, ~30 million total)
 Malagasy (17 million)
 Madurese (14 million)
 Batak (8.5 million, all dialects)
 Ilokano (8 million native, ~10 million total)
 Hiligaynon (Ilonggo) (7 million native, ~11 million total)
 Minangkabau (7 million)
 Bugis (5 million)
 Bikol (4.6 million, all dialects)
 Banjar (4.5 million)
 Acehnese (3.5 million)
 Balinese (3 million)

Dialects and creoles

Dialects of major Austronesian languages 
 Banyumas Javanese (15,000,000 native, Indonesia)
 Kedah Malay (5,000,000 native, Malaysia)
 Banten Sundanese (3,350,000 native, Indonesia)
 Palembang Malay (3,100,000 native, Indonesia)
 Central Bikol language (2,500,000 native, Philippines)
 Batak Toba language (2,000,000 native, Indonesia)
 Albay Bikol language (1,900,000 native, Philippines)
 Kelantan Malay (1,600,000 native, Malaysia)
 Pattani Malay (1,500,000 native, Thailand)
 Perak Malay (1,400,000 native, Malaysia)
 Batak Pakpak language (1,200,000 native, Indonesia)
 Batak Simalungun language (1,200,000 native, Indonesia)
 Batak Mandailing language (1,100,000 native, Indonesia)
 Terengganu Malay (1,100,000 native, Malaysia)
 Pahang Malay (1,000,000 native, Malaysia)
 Batak Angkola language (750,000 native, Indonesia)
 Jambi Malay (700,000 native, Indonesia)
 Batak Karo language (600,000 native, Indonesia)
 Osing Javanese (300,000 native, Indonesia)
 Batak Alas language (200,000 native, Indonesia)
 Itbayat language (3,500 native, Philippines)

Creoles and pidgins based on Austronesian languages 
 Betawi language (3,000,000 native, Indonesia)
 Sabah Malay (3,000,000, Malaysia)
 Manado Malay (850,000, Indonesia)
 North Moluccan Malay (700,000, Indonesia)
 Baba Malay (500,000, Indonesia and Malaysia)
 Papuan Malay (500,000, Indonesia)
 Ambonese Malay (250,000 native, Indonesia)
 Sri Lanka Malay (50,000, Sri Lanka)
 Lundayeh/Lun Bawang (30,000, East Malaysia and Indonesia)
 Kelabit language (5,000, East Malaysia and Indonesia)
 Cocos Malay (4,000, Australia and Malaysia)
 Chetty Malay (300?, Malaysia)
 Broome Pearling Lugger Pidgin (40?, Australia)
 Bahasa Rojak (?, Malaysia)

See also
 Austronesian Formal Linguistics Association

References

Austronesian